Calliotrochus marmoreus is a species of sea snail, a marine gastropod mollusk in the family Trochidae, the top snails.

Description
The height of the shell attains 6 mm, its diameter also 6 mm.  The small shell has a globose-turbinate shape and is narrowly perforate. It is thin, smooth, shining, marbled and mottled with various shades of olive, brown and pinkish, usually showing dots of white, or spiral lines of white and pink or brown articulated. The conical spire is short and has a minute, acute  apex. The sutures are impressed. The about 5 whorls are rounded. The body whorl is large, convex below and indented around the narrow white umbilicus. The oblique aperture is rounded-oval, with a very thin layer of bluish iridescent nacre within. The outer, basal and columella margins are well curved, thin, simple, and converging and united across the parietal wall by a thin layer of callus

Distribution
This marine species occurs in the following locations:
 Red Sea
 tropical Indo-Pacific
 Hawaii
 Queensland, Australia

References

 Pease, W.H. 1861. Descriptions of 47 new species of shells from the Sandwich Islands, in the collection of H. Cuming. Proceedings of the Zoological Society of London 1860: 431-438
 Garrett, A. 1857. On new species of marine shells of the Sandwich Islands. Proceedings of the California Academy of Sciences 1: 102-103
 Deshayes, G.P. 1863. Catalogue des Mollusques de l'Île de la Réunion (Bourbon). Annexe E in Maillard, L. (ed). Notes sur l'isle de La Réunion. Paris : Dentu
 Hedley, C. 1899. The Mollusca of Funafuti. Part 1. Gastropoda. Memoirs of the Australian Museum 3(7): 395-488
 Preston, H.B. 1908. Descriptions of new species of land, marine and freshwater shells from the Andaman Islands. Records of the Indian Museum 2(2): 187-210, pls 14-17
 Hedley, C. 1923. Studies on Australian Mollusca. Part XIV. Proceedings of the Linnean Society of New South Wales 48: 301-316, pls 30-33
 Iredale, T. 1937. Mollusca. 232-261, pls. 15-17 in Whitley, G.P. The Middleton and Elizabeth Reefs South Pacific Ocean. The Australian Zoologist 8: 232-261
 Ladd, H.S. 1966. Chitons and gastropods (Haliotidae through Adeorbidae) from the western Pacific Islands. United States Geological Survey Professional Papers 531: 1-98 16 pls
 Kilburn, R.N. 1977. Taxonomic studies on the marine Mollusca of southern Africa and Mozambique. Part 1. Annals of the Natal Museum 23(1): 173-214
 Kay, E.A. 1979. Hawaiian Marine Shells. Reef and shore fauna of Hawaii. Section 4 : Mollusca. Honolulu, Hawaii : Bishop Museum Press Bernice P. Bishop Museum Special Publication Vol. 64(4) 653 pp
 Herbert, D.G. 1998. Revision of the genus Calliotrochus Fischer, 1879 (Gastropoda: Trochoidea). Invertebrate Taxonomy 12: 545-565 
 Dekker, H. & Orlin Z. 2000. Checklist of Red Sea Mollusca. Spirula 47(Supplement): 1-46

External links

 To World Register of Marine Species

marmoreus
Gastropods described in 1861